Russell Bedsole is an American politician and law enforcement officer serving as a member of the Alabama House of Representatives from the 49th district. He was elected in November 2020, and he assumed office on December 7, 2020.

Education 
Bedsole earned a Bachelor of Arts degree in criminal justice from Auburn University and a Master of Science in Public Administration from Troy University.

Career 
Bedsole has served as a captain in the Shelby County Sheriff's Department. He was also a member of the Alabaster, Alabama City Council. He was elected to the Alabama House of Representatives in November 2020 and assumed office on December 7, 2020.

References 

Living people
People from Shelby County, Alabama
Auburn University alumni
Troy University alumni
Republican Party members of the Alabama House of Representatives
Year of birth missing (living people)